The 2000 Washington Attorney General election, took place on November 7, 2000. Incumbent attorney general and future governor, Christine Gregoire, was re-elected by a wide margin in a victory over Republican and perennial candidate Richard Pope.

Election results

See also
 2000 Washington gubernatorial election

References

2000 Washington (state) elections
2000
Washington